David Stokes  DD (died 10 May 1669) was a Canon of Windsor from 1628 to 1669.

Career
He was educated at Westminster School and then Trinity College, Cambridge where he was awarded a BA in 1615. From Peterhouse, Cambridge he was awarded an MA in 1618, and a DD in 1630.

He was appointed:
Fellow of Eton College (deprived 1644)
Rector of Brinklow, Warwickshire 1625
Rector of Binfield, Berkshire 1631 (deprived 1644)
Precentor of Chichester Cathedral 1629 - 1631
Rector of Everden 1638
Rector of Urchfont, Wiltshire 1644.

He was appointed to the third stall in St George's Chapel, Windsor Castle in 1628, a position he held until 1669, except for the period of the Commonwealth of England.

Notes 

1669 deaths
People educated at Westminster School, London
Canons of Windsor
Alumni of Trinity College, Cambridge
Alumni of Peterhouse, Cambridge
Fellows of Eton College
Year of birth missing